The following is a list of county routes in Camden County in the U.S. state of New Jersey.  For more information on the county route system in New Jersey as a whole, including its history, see County routes in New Jersey.

500-series county routes
In addition to those listed below, the following 500-series county routes serve Camden County:
CR 534, CR 536, CR 536 Spur, CR 537, CR 543, CR 544, CR 551, CR 551 Spur, CR 561, CR 573

Other county routes

See also

References

 
Camden